Maria Theresa (German: Maria Theresia) is a 1951 Austrian historical drama film directed by Emil E. Reinert and starring Paula Wessely, Fred Liewehr and Marianne Schönauer. It portrays the life of the eighteenth century Habsburg Empress Maria Theresa.

It was produced by star Paula Wessely's own production company. The film's sets were designed by the art director Werner Schlichting. Some location shooting took place at the Schönbrunn Palace in Vienna.

Cast
 Paula Wessely as Maria Theresia  
 Fred Liewehr as Franz I. 
 Marianne Schönauer as Maria Valeria von Aliano, spätere Fürstin Trautperg  
 Rosa Albach-Retty as Gräfin Fuchs  
 Kurti Baumgartner as Maximilian  
 Karl Ehmann 
 Maria Eis as Fürstin Gollinsky  
 Rudolf Fernau as Graf Kaunitz  
 Erik Frey as Fürst Trautperg  
 Harry Hardt 
 Franz Herterich 
 Attila Hörbiger as Hofkriegsratspräsident Harrach  
 Adrian Hoven as Leutnant Cordona  
 Milan von Kamare as Graf Lichtenau  
 Julius Karsten 
 Cees Laseur as Leibarzt von Swieten  
 Johanna Matz as Maria Elisabeth  
 Paul Pranger 
 Emmerich Reimers 
 Leopold Rudolf 
 Nina Sandt as Gräfin Susi Bernburg  
 Dagny Servaes as Obersthofmeisterin Gräfin Hagen  
 Otto Treßler as Graf Aliano  
 Robert Valberg 
 Rolf Wanka as Oberstkämmerer Khevenhüller 
 Karl Haberfellner as Leopold  
 Alfred Huttig 
 Susanne Kissner as Maria Amalia  
 Peter Klein as Ferdinand  
 Ingeborg Richter as Maria Carolina  
 Loni von Friedl as Marie Antoinette

References

Bibliography 
 Fritsche, Maria. Homemade Men in Postwar Austrian Cinema: Nationhood, Genre and Masculinity. Berghahn Books, 2013.

External links 
 

1951 films
1950s biographical drama films
1950s historical drama films
Austrian biographical drama films
Austrian historical drama films
1950s German-language films
Films set in Vienna
Films set in the 18th century
Biographical films about Austrian royalty
Cultural depictions of Maria Theresa
Cultural depictions of Marie Antoinette
Films directed by Emil-Edwin Reinert
1951 drama films
Austrian black-and-white films